Chiloglottis sphyrnoides, commonly known as the forest wasp orchid, is a species of orchid endemic to north-eastern New South Wales and south-eastern Queensland. It has two dark green leaves and a single green or reddish pink flower with a shiny black, insect-like callus surrounded by red club-shaped calli on two-thirds of the base of the labellum.

Description
This large callus is surrounded by reddish, club-shaped calli and small red calli. Flowering occurs from December to April.

Taxonomy and naming
Chiloglottis sphyrnoides was first formally described in 1991 by David Jones from a specimen collected in the Lamington National Park and the description was published in Australian Orchid Research. The specific epithet (sphyrnoides) refers to the similarity of the shape of the large callus on the labellum resembling the head of a shark in the genus Sphyrna. The ending -oides is derived from an Ancient Greek word εἶδος (eîdos),  meaning “form" or "likeness”.

Distribution and habitat
The forest wasp orchid grows in moist places in tall forest near Nowendoc and in the Lamington National Park.

References

External links 

sphyrnoides
Orchids of New South Wales
Orchids of Queensland
Plants described in 1991